is a city located in northwestern Okayama Prefecture, Japan.

As of March 31, 2017, the city has an estimated population of 30,583 (14,628 males, 15,955 females), with 12,857 households and a population density of 39 persons per km2. The total area is 793.27 km2. Niimi is located on the upper reaches of the Takahashi River (.

History 
Niimi was known as early as the Heian period (794–1185). A shōen manorial estate called Niimi-shō occupied much of the area of present-day Niimi. Due to its location on the Takahashi River, Niimi became an important center of inland trade. In the Sengoku period (1467–1573) the Seki clan controlled the area, and established the Niimi Domain. The modern city of Niimi was founded on June 1, 1954.

On March 31, 2005, Niimi absorbed the towns of Ōsa, Shingō, Tessei and Tetta (all from Atetsu District) to become a larger and expanded Niimi.

Geography
Climate
Niimi has a humid subtropical climate (Köppen climate classification Cfa).

Demographics
Per Japanese census data, the population of Niimi in 2020 is 28,079 people. Niimi has been conducting censuses since 1920.

Attractions
Niimi is known for its limestone caves. They include:
Ikura-do Cave
Maki-do Cave
Rashomon

Economy
Niimi was historically known for its iron sand quarries and the production of wagyu beef. The principle industries in modern Niimi are limestone quarrying, cement production, forestry, and tourism. Yamasa Company, Ltd., a producer of pachinko slot machines, is headquartered in the city. Farms in Niimi produce tobacco, peaches, and beef.  A black tea plantation is also being trialled here.

Education
The city is served by Niimi Kōritsu Tanki Daigaku, known in English as Niimi College.

Transportation

Rail
Niimi is an important railway center. The city is served by three JR West lines, and all meet at Niimi Station.Geibi Line (Niimi – Hiroshima, Hiroshima Prefecture)
Niimi Station – Nunohara Station – Bitchū Kōjiro Station – Sakane Station – Ichioka Station – Yagami Station – Nochi StationKishin Line (Himeji, Hyōgo Prefecture—Niimi)
Osakabe Station – Tajibe Station – Iwayama Station—Niimi Station.Hakubi Line' (Kurashiki, Okayama Prefecture – Yonago, Tottori Prefecture)
Ikura Station – Ishiga Station—Niimi Station—Nunohara Station—Bitchū-Kōjiro Station – Ashidachi Station – Niizato Station

Bus

Highway
Chūgoku Expressway
Japan National Route 180
Japan National Route 182

Sister/Friendship cities
Niimi maintains the following Sister/Friendship Cities.
 New Paltz, New York,  United States since 1998.
 Sidney, British Columbia, Canada since 2008.
 Xinyang, People's Republic of China since 1992.

References

External links
 Niimi City official website 
 

Cities in Okayama Prefecture